Water skiing was one of two demonstration sports at the 1972 Summer Olympics in Munich.  It was the only time that the sport was demonstrated at any Olympic Games.  35 participants from 20 countries took part in six events: slalom, figure skiing, and ski jump for each of men and women skiers.  The slalom events took place on September 1 and the figure skiing and ski jump events took place on September 2.

Event results

Men's slalom

Men's Trick skiing

Men's jump

Women's slalom

Women's figure skiing

Women's jump

References
 

1972 Summer Olympics events
Olympics
Discontinued sports at the Summer Olympics
Olympic demonstration sports
Olym
Men's events at the 1972 Summer Olympics
Women's events at the 1972 Summer Olympics